East River is a  stream in Gunnison County, Colorado, United States. It flows south from Emerald Lake in the Maroon Bells Wilderness to a confluence with the Taylor River that forms the Gunnison River.

See also

 List of rivers of Colorado
 List of tributaries of the Colorado River

References

External links

Rivers of Colorado
Rivers of Gunnison County, Colorado
Tributaries of the Colorado River in Colorado